Anton Perich is a Croatian-American filmmaker, photographer and video artist, born in Dubrovnik, Croatia, in 1945. He has lived and worked in New York City since 1970.

Biography
 
From 1965 to 1970, Perich lived in Paris, France and became close to the group of poets and artist working in the Lettrism group: (Isidore Isou, Maurice Lemaître), but also with the French film underground milieu (Piero Heliczer, Michel Auder, Raphaël Bassan, Slobodan Pajic, Pierre Clémenti). During that period, Perich changed his first name and became Antoine Perich, because Anton was not familiar a name in France. He was among the first activists to present, every week, programs of avant-garde and underground films at the American Center in Paris.

He moved to New York in 1970, became friends with Andy Warhol and contributed as a photographer to Warhol's Interview.
He also worked as a busboy at the legendary Max's Kansas City, where he photographed the scene as an ongoing art performance every night, along with exhibiting the photos on the walls.

In 1977–78, he designed and built an electric painting machine, an early predecessor of the inkjet printer. The development of this machine rendered Perich a pioneer of electric-digital-computer art.

In 1978, he founded NIGHT as an interactive "gallery space" for his photography and the nightly activities at places such as Studio 54.
In 2006, he had a video retrospective at the Anthology Film Archives, in New York.

In 2012, the Italian film production Minimal Cinema produced In the fabulous underground, an unconventional art documentary and a portrait of Perich as an artist and as a man, directed by Claudio Romano and Mauro John Capece and produced by Betty L'Innocente. The film was screened at the contemporary art center of New Orleans on Saturday the 13th.

His son, Tristan Perich, is a noted composer and visual artist.

Notes

References
 Revisiting Max's, Sanctuary for the Hip,   by Randy Kennedy September 05, 2010, Two coming exhibitions shed new light on the glory days of Max's Kansas City, an oasis for artists in the 1960s and '70s

External links
Perich's Biography
Perich's bio and works
Perich's Painting machine
Perich's Interview

Living people
1945 births
Yugoslav emigrants to the United States
American photographers
American filmmakers
Yugoslav expatriates in France